Jeanne Sandford (born 30 September 1926) was a British alpine skier. She competed in two events at the 1956 Winter Olympics.

References

1926 births
Living people
British female alpine skiers
Olympic alpine skiers of Great Britain
Alpine skiers at the 1956 Winter Olympics
Place of birth missing (living people)